Ŝ or ŝ (S circumflex) is a consonant in Esperanto orthography, representing the sound .

Esperanto orthography uses a diacritic for all four of its postalveolar consonants, as do most Latin-based Slavic alphabets (Polish is the most notable exception). Letters and digraphs that are similar to ŝ (also based on s) and represent the same sound include Czech, Latvian, Lithuanian, Slovak, Slovene, Serbian Latin,  and Croatian š, Albanian and English sh, German sch, Polish sz, Azerbaijani, Turkish and Turkmen ş, Romanian ș, Hungarian s,  French ch, and Portuguese x and ch. The Cyrillic letter ш represents the same sound.

Ŝ is used in ISO 9:1995 (standard of transliteration into Latin characters of Cyrillic characters) for letter Щ.

See also
 Ĉ
 Ĝ
 Ĥ
 Ĵ
 Ŭ

Esperanto letters with diacritics
Latin letters with diacritics